This list contains the online videos, music videos, and film trailers that have received the most views within 24 hours of release. Video views are generated from different online platforms such as Facebook, iQIYI and YouTube.

Top videos

Film trailers and music videos are excluded here. Chinese production company and video platform service iQIYI has released four of the top-ten most-viewed videos.

Top music videos

Out of the top ten most-viewed music videos, two artists have more than one video listed: BTS has five, and Blackpink has three.

In September 2019, YouTube changed their policy on video view counts and excluded paid advertising views from future 24-hour statistics.

Historical record holders
The following table lists the videos that held the record for YouTube's most-viewed music video in the first 24 hours, from January 2012 to the present.

Controversy
In July 2019, there was some controversy regarding the legitimacy of YouTube's 24-hour records, after Indian hip hop rapper Badshah's song "Paagal" received 75million views in 24 hours, and surpassed the viewership record of "Boy with Luv" by K-pop group BTS and American singer Halsey. YouTube did not congratulate Badshah like it did for previous record holders and later released a statement that Badshah's record label, Sony Music India, had purchased advertisements from Google and YouTube that embedded the video or directed fans to it in some way. It also emerged that this is a common practice in the global music industry, and similar methods had also been used by the record labels of previous record holders such as Ariana Grande, Blackpink and Taylor Swift, thus casting doubt on some of the past 24-hour viewership records on YouTube. On September 13, 2019, YouTube announced that their charts will no longer include paid advertising views. In a statement to Forbes the following day, the platform also confirmed that "Based on our long-time criteria, Badshah did not qualify for our 24 hour debut records list".

Top trailers
Walt Disney Studios has released seven of the ten most-viewed movie trailers. Five are for films belonging to the Marvel Cinematic Universe, excluding Spider-Man: No Way Home, which was released by Sony Pictures Releasing.

Historical record holders
The following table lists the videos that held the record for the most-viewed online trailers in the first 24 hours, from October 2012 to the present.

See also
 List of most-viewed YouTube videos
 List of viral videos

References

21st century-related lists
Videos, online, most-viewed
Video on demand
Videos in the first 24 hours
Lists of videos